Prokino is a rural locality (a village) in Staroselskoye Rural Settlement, Vologodsky District, Vologda Oblast, Russia. The population was 11 as of 2002.

Geography 
Prokino is located 36 km southwest of Vologda (the district's administrative centre) by road. Kubayevo is the nearest rural locality.

References 

Rural localities in Vologodsky District